The 1927 Army Cadets football team represented the United States Military Academy in the 1927 college football season. In their second season under head coach Biff Jones, the Cadets compiled a 9–1 record, shut out six of their ten opponents, and outscored all opponents by a combined total of 197 to 37.  In the annual Army–Navy Game, the Cadets defeated the Midshipmen   The team's only loss came to national champion Yale by a 10 to 6 score. The team was ranked No. 6 in the nation in the Dickinson System ratings released in December 1927.
 
Four Army players were recognized on the All-America team. Halfback Red Cagle was a consensus first-team honoree and was later inducted into the College Football Hall of Fame. Tackle Bud Sprague was selected as a first-team honoree by the Associated Press (AP), the International News Service (INS), and the Central Press Association (CP). End Charles Born was selected as a second-team honoree by the United Press (UP), Hearst newspapers, New York Sun, and Billy Evans.  Tackle George Perry was selected as a first-team honoree by the New York Sun.

Schedule

Players
The following players won varsity letters for their participation on the 1927 Army football team.

 Charles Born - end
 Samuel Brentnall - end
 Red Cagle - back (College Football Hall of Fame)
 Paul Elias
 Herbert Gibner
 William Evens Hall - center
 Louis A. Hammack - guard
 Norris B. Harbold - end
 Charles I. Humber
 Richard C. Hutchinson
 Arthur W. Meehan - back
 John H. Murrell - back
 William L. Nave
 Howard E. Pearson - center
 George W. Perry - tackle
 LaVerne G. Saunders - tackle
 Lyle Seeman - guard
 Bud Sprague - tackle (College Football Hall of Fame)
 Birrell Walsh
 Harry Wilson - captain (College Football Hall of Fame)

References

Army
Army Black Knights football seasons
Army Cadets football